Salute!, is a 2017 Namibian drama film directed by Philippe Talavera and produced as a Ombetja Yehinga Organisation (OYO) film. It stars Adriano Visagie, Odile Muller, David Ndjavera in lead roles along with newcomer Monray Garoëb. The film focused on the life of Carlito 'Kado', who is sentenced to three years in prison for fraud, leaving his pregnant girlfriend to fend for herself in the real world. 

The film was premiered in October 2017 at the Warehouse Theater. The film received positive reviews and won several awards at international film festivals. On 30 November 2019 at Canal Olympia Ouaga 2000, in Ouagadougou, Burkina Faso, lead actor Adriano Visagie won the Sotigui Award for Best Actor Southern Africa. It is also nominated as best film Southern Africa at the 2018 Africa Magic Viewers Choice Awards (AMVCA) as well as selected at AIDS 2018 in Amsterdam.

Plot

Cast
 Adriano Visagie as Carlito 'Kado'
 Odile Muller
 David Ndjavera
 Monray Garoëb 
 Dawie Engelbrecht
 Desmond Kamericka
 Sakanombo Kasoma
 Jeremiah Jeremiah
 Dennis !Kharuchab
 Bruno Caldeira

References

External links
 Salute! on YouTube
 SALUTE! Special Screening with Cast Q&A
 Salute!
 ‘Salute’ to salute the Coast
 Namibian film nominated for 6th Annual Africa Magic Viewers’ Choice Awards
 2017 ‘Year of the Creatives’

2017 films
Namibian drama films